In the Canadian province of Saskatchewan, a city is a type of incorporated urban municipality that is created from a town by the minister of municipal affairs. The city form of governmental organization is created by a ministerial order via section 39 of The Cities Act if the town has a population of 5,000 or more and if the change in status is requested by the town council. 

In the early history of the province, the threshold for city status was much lower, with both Saskatoon and Regina achieving city status with populations in the 3,000 range. One city, Melville, currently has a population well below the current 5,000 threshold, but retains its city status even though the population criterion has changed since its current governmental form was designated.

Saskatchewan has 16 cities including Lloydminster, which traverses the provincial border with Alberta, but does not include Flin Flon, which traverses the provincial border with Manitoba. With the exception of Flin Flon, Saskatchewan's other cities had a cumulative population of 595,707 and an average population of 37,232 in the 2011 Census. Saskatchewan's largest and smallest cities are Saskatoon and Melville with populations of 246,376 and 4,562 respectively. 

List 

Notes:

Gallery

See also 
List of communities in Saskatchewan
List of municipalities in Saskatchewan

Notes

References 

Saskatchewan
Cities